Chancellor Lakes are small twin lakes near the crest of the ridge north of the Walcott Glacier. They were named by the New Zealand University of Wellington Antarctic Expedition, 1960–61, in honor of the chancellor of that university.

References
 

Lakes of Victoria Land
Scott Coast